Sommer Contemporary Art is a contemporary art gallery, owned by Irit Fine Sommer and based on Rothschild Boulevard in Tel Aviv, Israel.

The gallery is considered to be among the most influential in Israel for contemporary art. It was first opened in a small space on Rothschild 64 in 1999. Since its opening the purpose of the gallery was the promotion of contemporary Israeli artists in the international art scene, as well as representing and exhibiting international artists in Israel and abroad. 
In November 2005 the gallery moved to a new space on Rothschild 13, in one of the historic buildings of Tel Aviv. 
Sommer Contemporary Art is representing such artists as Adi Nes, Yehudit Sasportas, Yael Bartana, Thomas Zipp, Greogor Hildebrandt, and Ugo Rondinone.

Artists 
Artists shown in the gallery include:

 Saâdane Afif
 Darren Almond
 Naama Arad
 Yael Bartana
 Guy Ben Ner
 Tom Burr
 Rineke Dijkastra
 Karl Haendel
 Peter Halley
 Lyle Ashton Harris
 Michal Helfman
 Gregor Hildebrandt
 Chris Martin
 Adi Nes
 Tal R
 Muntean/Rosenblum
 Ugo Rondinone 
 Wilhelm Sasnal
 Yehudit Sasportas 
 Efrat Shvily
 Wolfgang Tillmans
 Paloma Varga Weisz
 Sharon Yaari
 Rona Yefman
 Thomas Zipp

References

External links
sommergallery.com

Contemporary art galleries in Israel